Baláž (feminine Balážová) is a Slovak surname, derivative of Hungarian Balázs. It may refer to:

 Barbora Balážová, Slovak table tennis player
 Blažej Baláž, Slovak artist
 Jozef Baláž, Slovak ice hockey player
 Juraj Baláž, Slovak footballer
 Ľubomíra Balážová, Slovak cross-country skier
 Mária Balážová, Slovak artist
 Pavol Baláž, Slovak footballer
 Peter Baláž (boxer) (b. 1974), Slovak boxer
 Peter Baláž (esperantist), Slovak esperantist and publisher
 Rudolf Baláž (1940–2011), Slovak Catholic bishop
 Vladislav Baláž, Slovak ice hockey player

See also 
 Peter Baláž (disambiguation)

Slovak-language surnames
Surnames of Hungarian origin